Trinidad is an unincorporated community and ghost town in Grant County, Washington. The town is located between Quincy and Wenatchee atop a ridge overlooking the Columbia River.

Trinidad was originally a railroad stop and was named by workers for the Great Northern Railway due to its geological and physical similarity to Trinidad, Colorado. Trinidad is located on the border with Douglas County, directly above the Crescent Bar Resort on the Columbia River. Though previously a ghost town, Trinidad has become a more popular location for new residential structures. The White Heron Cellars winery has been located above Trinidad since 1989.

References

Unincorporated communities in Grant County, Washington
Unincorporated communities in Washington (state)
Ghost towns in Washington (state)